Gurudas Gauns was an Indian politician who served as Member of Goa Legislative Assembly from Pale Assembly constituency. In 2007 Goa Legislative Assembly election, he got 7,768 votes.

Personal life 
He was born on 6 October 1966 to Prabhakar Gauns and Parvati P. Gauns in Navelim, Bicholim. He married Ashwini Gauns and have one child, He was the brother of Pratap Prabhakar Gauns. He died on 4 June 2008.

References 

1966 births
2008 deaths